Hippocras, sometimes spelled hipocras or hypocras, is a drink made from wine  mixed with sugar and spices, usually including cinnamon, and  possibly heated. After steeping the spices in the sweetened wine for a day, the spices are strained out through a conical cloth filter bag called a manicum hippocraticum or Hippocratic sleeve (originally devised by the 5th century BC Greek physician Hippocrates to filter water), from which the name of the drink is derived.

History
Spiced wine was popular in the Roman Empire, as seen in the writings of Pliny the Elder and Apicius. In the 12th century, a spiced wine named "pimen" or "piment" was mentioned by Chrétien de Troyes. During the 13th century, the city of Montpellier had a reputation for trading spiced wines with England. The first recipes for spiced wine appeared at the end of the 13th century (recipes for red wine and piment found in the Tractatus de Modo) or at the beginning of the 14th century (recipe for piment in the Regiment de Sanitat of Arnaldus de Villa Nova). Since 1390, recipes for piment have also been called ipocras or ypocras (Forme of Cury in England, Ménagier de Paris or Viandier de Taillevent in France), probably with reference and tribute to Hippocrates. In the Catalan cookbook Llibre del Coch (1520) the recipe is given as pimentes de clareya.

The drink became extremely popular and was regarded as having various medicinal or even aphrodisiac properties.

In the 16th century, food was classified along two axes: cold or hot, dry or wet. People at that time believed in pursuing “balance” between these, for instance by stewing dry ingredients like root vegetables and roasting wet foods like suckling pig. Wine was considered to be cold and dry, and so to this warm ingredients like sugar, ginger and cinnamon were added, creating hypocras.

Cookbooks and pharmacological manuals both provide recipes. This traditional recipe goes back to 1631: Take 10 lb. best Red wine or White wine, 1½ oz. cinnamon, 2 scruples cloves, 4 scruples of each cardamom and grains of paradise (Aframomum melegueta), 3 drams ginger. Crush the spices coarsely and steep in the wine for 3 or 4 hours. Add 1½ lb. whitest sugar. Pass through the sleeve several times, and it is ready.

Since the 16th century, the word has been generally spelled hippocras or hipocras in English and hypocras in French. Original recipes for hippocras were made until the 19th century, when it fell out of favor. This wine is made with sugar and spices. Sugar then was considered to be medicine and the spices varied according to the recipes. The main spices are: cinnamon, ginger, clove, grains of paradise and long pepper. An English text specifies that sugar was uniquely for the lords and honey was for the people. Since the 17th century, spiced wines, in France, have been generally prepared with fruits (apples, oranges, almonds) and musk or ambergris. In England, in 1723, there was a recipe for red hippocras containing milk and brandy. The drink was well liked during medieval and Elizabethan times. Moreover, doctors prescribed it to aid digestion. It was served at most banquets all over Europe.

The drink was highly prized during the high and late Middle Ages. In France, it has been noted as the favorite drink of notorious baron Gilles de Rais, who reportedly drank several bottles every day and had his victims drink it prior to assault. Later, King Louis XIV of France was also known to enjoy it. In those times, the drink was a highly valued gift item, in the same vein as jam and fruit preserves. Hippocras fell out of fashion and was forgotten during the 18th century.

In France, hypocras is still produced in the Ariège and Haute Loire areas, though in very small quantities.

Since 1996 the population of Basel celebrate on New Year's morning the so-called "Aadringgede" (a drinking cheer). The "Dreizack"-fountain in the "Freiestrasse" will be filled with hippocras, spelled in the Swiss German of Basel, "Hypokras". In Basel it is a tradition in winter to drink Hypokras and eat the famous Basler Läggerli (biscuits) with it.

The drink may have eventually inspired the Spaniards in their creation of sangria. While sweeter than hippocras, sangria is still often made with spices, including cinnamon, ginger, and pepper.

See also
 Ancient Greece and wine
 Mulled wine
 Culinary Heritage of Switzerland

References

Further reading

External links
 
 Hippocras 

Ancient wine
Swiss wine
Cocktails with wine
Medieval wine
Culinary Heritage of Switzerland